Mount Tyrwhitt is a mountain in British Columbia and Alberta, Canada located between Highway 40 and Elk Pass in the Elk Range of the Canadian Rockies, west of the Highwood Pass parking lot in Kananaskis Country and south east of Upper Kananaskis Lake.  Located on the Continental Divide, it is also therefore on the border between British Columbia and Alberta which follows the Divide in this area.

The mountain was named in 1918 after First Admiral Reginald Tyrwhitt, a senior officer in the Royal Navy during the First World War.


Gallery

See also
 List of peaks on the Alberta–British Columbia border

References

External links
 

Two-thousanders of Alberta
Two-thousanders of British Columbia
Great Divide of North America
Canadian Rockies